East Poland is an unincorporated village in the town of Poland, Androscoggin County, Maine, United States. East Poland has a post office with ZIP code 04230, which opened on September 4, 1826.

References

Villages in Androscoggin County, Maine
Villages in Maine